Francisco de Paula Leite de Sousa, visconde de (Viscount of) Veiros (17471833) was Portuguese military officer.

According to Oman (1903), of all the Portuguese commanders, Leite was the one whom Wellington most trusted and "every British narrator of the war who came in contact with him has a word of praise in his behalf".

Peninsular War

Evora (1808)

Following his Invasion of Portugal (1807) and wishing to reopen his communications with Elvas, and to keep the way clear towards Badajoz, the direction in which he would have to retreat, if he had to evacuate Lisbon, Junot sent General Loison at the head of a strong flying column—seven and a half battalions, two regiments of dragoons, and eight guns—over 7,000 men in all.  

On reaching Évora, the capital of the Alentejo on 29 July, Loison was surprised to find General Leite ready for battle in the open. Leite had been able to organize a battalion and a half of infantry and 120 horse and had been joined by the Spanish Colonel Moretti, from Badajoz, with about the same number of foot, plus the Hussars of Maria Luisa regiment of regular cavalry and seven guns: 3,000 men in total, while a multitude of peasants and citizens manned the walls of the town.

Despite Leite's defeat at Evora, Wellington's plans for the winter of 1809-10 included giving Leite the most important command of Portuguese troops; that of the strongest fortress of Portugal, Elvas, together with the 6,000 men of its garrison (of whom half were regulars). By 1810, this force had increased to 8,000 men, comprising two regiments of regulars and five of militia.

References

 

1747 births
1833 deaths
Portuguese generals
Portuguese military commanders of the Napoleonic Wars
Military leaders of the French Revolutionary Wars